Alberto Basso (born Turin, 21 August 1931) is an Italian musicologist and librarian.

He started his activity in 1952 with a monograph on Stravinsky. In 1956 he graduated in law at the University of Turin but his activity was then fully devoted to music. From 1961 to 1974 he taught history of music at the Conservatory of Turin, where he was also librarian from 1974 to 1993. From 1973 to 1979 and from 1994 to 1997 he was president of the Italian Society of Musicology. In 1986 Basso founded the Istituto per i Beni Musicali in Piemonte (Institute for Musical Heritage of Piedmont). In 1982 he became a member of the Accademia Nazionale di Santa Cecilia. Basso is also a member of Accademia Filarmonica Romana (from 1986), Accademia Filarmonica di Bologna (from 1996) and honorary member of the Reial Acadèmia Catalana de Belles Arts de Sant Jordi (from 2000). In 2004 he received an honorary degree from the Autonomous University of Barcelona. In 1984 Basso was appointed knight of the Order of Merit of the Italian Republic.

From 1961 Basso has worked in the musicology section of the Turin publishing company UTET. For UTET he edited many important collective publications: La Musica (1966–1971), Storia dell'opera (1977), Dizionario Enciclopedico Universale della Musica e dei Musicisti (DEUMM, 1983–2005), Musica in scena. Storia dello spettacolo musicale (1995–1996).

For the French music publishing company Opus 111 Basso created the series Tesori del Piemonte (Treasures of Piedmont, started in 1985), which includes the Vivaldi Edition, a complete edition of all the compositions by Antonio Vivaldi (about 450) owned by the Turin National University Library.

Works
Il corale organistico di J.S. Bach, in L'Approdo Musicale, Anno IV nn. 14-15, 1961
Il Conservatorio di Musica «G. Verdi» di Torino. Storia e documenti dalle origini al 1970, Turin, UTET, 1971
L'età di Bach e di Händel, volume V of Storia della musica,  Società Italiana di Musicologia, Turin, EDT, 1976
Il Teatro della Città dal 1788 al 1936, volume II of Storia del Teatro Regio di Torino, Turin, Cassa di Risparmio di Torino, 1976
Frau Musika. La vita e le opere di J. S. Bach, 2 Volumes, Turin, EDT (volume I: 1979; volume II: 1983)
Sui sentieri della musica. Appunti per una rassegna iconografica, with Luciano Berio and Alberto Conforti, Milan, IdeaLibri, 1985
J. S. Bach. Tracce di una vita profonda, Turin, Lioness Club, 1985
L'invenzione della gioia. Musica e massoneria nell'età dei Lumi, Milan, Garzanti, 1994
Storia della musica (dalle origini al XIX secolo), 3 Volumes, Turin, UTET, 2004–05 (in the fourth section of DEUMM)
I Mozart in Italia, Rome, Accademia Nazionale di Santa Cecilia, 2006

Basso was also editor of the following publications:
La Musica: Enciclopedia storica (4 Volumes, 1966) and Dizionario (2 Volumes, 1971), Turin, UTET
Storia del Teatro Regio di Torino, 6 Volumes, Turin, Cassa di Risparmio di Torino, 1976–1991
Storia dell'opera, 3 Volumes, Turin, UTET, 1977
Dizionario Enciclopedico Universale della Musica e dei Musicisti (DEUMM), 22 Volumes in four sections, Turin, UTET, 1983–2005
L'arcano incanto. Il Teatro Regio di Torino, 1740–1990 (catalogue of the homonymous exhibition), Milan, Electa, 1991
Compact Enciclopedia della musica, Novara, De Agostini, 1995
Musica in scena. Storia dello spettacolo musicale, 6 Volumes, Turin, UTET, 1995–1996

Sources
 Update: Appendice 2005, p. 33, 2004.

Italian musicologists
Academic staff of the Accademia Nazionale di Santa Cecilia
Writers from Turin
1931 births
Living people
University of Turin alumni